John Scott Everton (March 7, 1908 – January 23, 2003) was an American college president and diplomat.

He was educated at Colgate University Divinity School, Cambridge, and Yale.  He worked on the research staff at the Ford Foundation.

He served as president of Kalamazoo College in 1949–53, and as U.S. Ambassador to Burma in 1961–63.  In 1968–71, he was president of Robert College in Istanbul, Turkey, before it was incorporated into Boğaziçi University.

He volunteered his time as an interpreter at the Cape Cod Museum of Natural History in the early 1990s.

References 
 Presidents of Kalamazoo College
 History of Boğaziçi University
 U.S. Ambassadors to Burma (U.S. State Department)
 Social Security Death Index listing for JOHN S EVERTON
 "U.S. Envoy to Burma Resigns," New York Times, May 9, 1963
 "Ex-Envoy Heads College in Turkey," New York Times, April 28, 1968

1908 births
2003 deaths
Presidents of Kalamazoo College
Ambassadors of the United States to Myanmar
United States Foreign Service personnel
20th-century American academics